Esthlogena brunnescens is a species of beetle in the family Cerambycidae. It was described by Stephan von Breuning in 1940. It is known from Colombia.

References

Pteropliini
Beetles described in 1940